Annie Elizabeth Gordon (20 July 1873–28 May 1951) was a New Zealand salvation army officer, rescue home matron and probation officer. She was born in Timaru, South Canterbury, New Zealand on 20 July 1873.

References

1873 births
1951 deaths
New Zealand Salvationists
People from Timaru
Probation and parole officers